A View from the Top of the World is the fifteenth studio album by American progressive metal band Dream Theater, released on October 22, 2021. This is their first album to be recorded at their own studio, DTHQ (Dream Theater Headquarters), as well as their first since Black Clouds & Silver Linings (2009) to include fewer than nine tracks, and the first since Dream Theater (2013) both to contain a track of at least ten minutes in length and to end with the longest track.

Background and production 
The band began work on A View from the Top of the World about a year after the release of their then-latest album, Distance over Time (2019). Metal Addicts reported in April 2020 that Dream Theater (who had recently rescheduled and eventually cancelled their touring plans due to the COVID-19 pandemic) was planning to work on a new album in 2021. On the direction of the album, guitarist John Petrucci stated in an August 2020 interview with Ultimate Guitar: "The eight-string project with Ernie Ball Music Man is something we are working on and hoping to have developed as this year goes on. I'm hoping that on the next Dream Theater record I'll be able to explore that." Petrucci later confirmed, during an October 2020 interview with Revolver that, within the next few weeks, the band would be heading into DTHQ (the band's newly constructed studio) to get started on a new album.

Four of the five members wrote together in-studio, while frontman James LaBrie instead contributed via Zoom meetings remotely from Canada, as not to risk any potential compromising of his voice. When asked in an interview about the album's progress, Petrucci said that the writing sessions were "off to a great start". These sessions spanned over the next four months until March, after which LaBrie, at last, flew from Canada to meet them in New York to record vocals. This recording session also marked Dream Theater's first collaboration with Andy Sneap, who mastered and mixed the album, having recently worked with Petrucci on his second solo album Terminal Velocity (2020).

Dream Theater teased the album on July 26, 2021, revealing the initials of each of the seven song's titles and their respective run-times. Two days later, it was announced that the album was titled A View from the Top of the World, and was planned for release on October 22, 2021. Two singles were released to support A View from the Top of the World: "The Alien" and "Invisible Monster", while music videos for tracks "Awaken the Master" and "Transcending Time" were released after the album release date.

"The Alien" won the Grammy for Best Metal Performance in 2022, giving the band their first Grammy win after having been nominated for the third time (they were nominated in 2012 for "On the Backs of Angels" and in 2014 with "The Enemy Inside").

The front cover photo is of Kjeragbolten in Norway.

Accolades

Track listing

Personnel 
Dream Theater
 James LaBrie – vocals
 John Petrucci – guitars, production
 John Myung – bass
 Jordan Rudess – keyboards
 Mike Mangini – drums

Production
 James "Jimmy T" Meslin – engineering, additional production
 Andy Sneap – mixing, mastering
 Hugh Syme – art direction, illustration, design
 Rayon Richards – band photos

Charts

References 

2021 albums
Albums impacted by the COVID-19 pandemic
Dream Theater albums
Inside Out Music albums